Razzle Dazzle: A Journey into Dance is a 2007 Australian mockumentary comedy film directed by Darren Ashton about competitive dance, first screened on 15 March 2007.

Synopsis 
Mr Jonathan (Ben Miller) runs a dance class in which he attempts to comment on social issues. After his team is accepted into a national dance competition, he must come up with a winning and socially relevant routine to beat out an elite dance team.

Selected cast
Nick Twiney
Kerry Armstrong
Denise Roberts
Tara Morice
Ben Miller
Jane Hall
Nadine Garner
Toni Lamond
Noeline Brown
Josephine Barwick
Barry Crocker
Damon Gameau
Scott Irwin
Steve Le Marquand
Roy Billing
Rachel Gordon
Belinda Stewart-Wilson
Andrew McFarlane
Jazketteers
Jamie McKenzie

Box office
Razzle Dazzle: A Journey into Dance grossed $1,640,644 at the box office in Australia, trailing the comedy films Wild Hogs and Hot Fuzz.

See also
Cinema of Australia

References

External links 
 

2007 films
Australian comedy films
2000s mockumentary films
Films scored by Roger Mason (musician)
2007 comedy films
2000s English-language films
2000s Australian films